The Manitoba Sports Hall of Fame and Museum is a Canadian museum in Winnipeg, Manitoba, dedicated to honoring the history and achievements of sports in Manitoba. The organization began in 1980, and then opened a museum in The Forks in 1993. After five years, the museum moved to The Bay store on Portage Avenue. Its present-day location is the Sport Manitoba building (145 Pacific Ave.), where it had its grand opening on October 27, 2012.

Exhibits of Manitoba's sports teams and honoured athletes are displayed in the museum.

The Hall of Fame inducts both individuals as well as teams.

Individual Members

Members by sport

Through 2022, 311 Athletes, 133 Builders and 10 Athlete / Builders have been inducted into the Manitoba Sports Hall of Fame. Here's the breakdown by sport. (note: some individuals were inducted for more than one sport and are counted in each of their sports)

Teams

Types of teams inducted

Through 2022, 109 teams from 13 different sports have been inducted into the Manitoba Sports Hall of Fame. Here's the breakdown by sport.

Affiliations
The Museum is affiliated with: CMA,  CHIN, and Virtual Museum of Canada.

References

External links
Manitoba Sports Hall of Fame

Sports museums in Canada
Halls of fame in Canada
All-sports halls of fame
Canadian sports trophies and awards
Museums in Winnipeg
Awards established in 1980
Museums established in 1993
Manitoba awards